Ezine District is a district of the Çanakkale Province of Turkey. Its seat is the town of Ezine. Its area is 727 km2, and its population is 32,374 (2021).

Composition
There are two municipalities in Ezine District:
 Ezine
 Geyikli

There are 49 villages in Ezine District:

 Akçakeçili
 Akköy
 Aladağ
 Alemşah
 Arasanlı
 Bahçeli
 Balıklı
 Belen
 Bozalan
 Bozeli
 Bozköy
 Çamköy
 Çamlıca
 Çamoba
 Çarıksız
 Çetmi
 Çınarköy
 Dalyan
 Derbentbaşı
 Gökçebayır
 Güllüce
 Hisaralan
 Karadağ
 Karagömlek
 Kayacık
 Kemallı
 Kızılköy
 Kızıltepe
 Köprübaşı
 Körüktaşı
 Köseler
 Kumburun
 Mahmudiye
 Mecidiye
 Pazarköy
 Pınarbaşı
 Şapköy
 Sarısöğüt
 Sarpdere
 Taştepe
 Tavaklı
 Uluköy
 Üsküfçü
 Üvecik
 Yahyaçavuş
 Yavaşlar
 Yaylacık
 Yeniköy
 Yenioba

References

Districts of Çanakkale Province